Alton Ledell Robinson (born June 2, 1998) is an American football outside linebacker for the Seattle Seahawks of the National Football League (NFL). He played college football at Syracuse.

Early life and high school
Robinson was born in San Antonio, Texas and grew up in Converse, Texas. He attended Judson High School where he was a member of the basketball, football and track & field teams. He recorded 15 sacks and 20 tackles for loss as a junior and was named first-team All-District 25-6A. He committed to play college football at Texas A&M over offers from Alabama, Texas, Michigan, Baylor and Oklahoma State after his junior year. As a senior, Robinson recorded 44 tackles, including 23 for a loss, and 12 sacks and was named honorable mention All-State and All-Area by the San Antonio Express-News. Shortly after National Signing Day, Robinson was charged with second-degree felony robbery after being accused of stealing an ex-girlfriend's purse, and eventually, Texas A&M withdrew their scholarship offer. The charges were later downgraded to misdemeanors and ultimately dismissed entirely. After charges were dropped Robinson was close to signing with Oklahoma State, but was unable to due to the Big 12 Conference's misconduct policy.

College career
Robinson began his collegiate career at Northeastern Oklahoma A&M College. In his only season with the Golden Norsemen, he recorded 67 total tackles, 17 tackles for loss and 14 sacks and was named second-team All-Southwest Junior College Football Conference. Following the end of the season Robinson again recruited by Oklahoma State but was not offered a scholarship due to uncertainty regarding the Big 12's moral conduct policy. He committed to transfer to New Mexico State, but he ultimately de-committed in August and opted to sign with Syracuse.

Robinson became a starter at defensive end for the Orange early in his first season with the team and led the team with five sacks and the defensive line with 30 tackles. As a junior, he finished second in the Atlantic Coast Conference (ACC) with 10 sacks along with 39 tackles, 17 tackles for loss and three forced fumbles and was named second-team all-conference. Robinson sat out the team's bowl game due to personal reasons. Robinson was named honorable mention All-ACC as a senior after recording 46 tackles, 9.5 tackles for loss, 4.5 sacks and a forced fumble.

Professional career

Robinson was selected by the Seattle Seahawks in the fifth round with the 148th pick in the 2020 NFL Draft.

In Week 3 against the Dallas Cowboys, Robinson recorded his first career sack on Dak Prescott during the 38–31 win.

On September 12, 2022, Robinson was placed on injured reserve with a knee injury.

References

External links
Seattle Seahawks bio
Syracuse Orange bio

1998 births
Living people
Players of American football from San Antonio
American football defensive ends
Syracuse Orange football players
Judson High School alumni
Northeastern Oklahoma A&M Golden Norsemen football players
Seattle Seahawks players